Badshahpur Assembly constituency is one of the 90 constituencies in the Haryana Legislative Assembly of Haryana a north state of India. It is a part of Gurgaon Lok Sabha constituency.

Members of the Legislative Assembly
2009: Rao Dharampal, Indian National Congress
2014: Rao Narbir Singh, Bharatiya Janata Party

Election results

2019 result

2014 result

2009 result

References

Assembly constituencies of Haryana